The Director of Public Prosecutions (DPP) is the head of the Public Prosecution Service of Northern Ireland, and is appointed by the Attorney General for Northern Ireland. The position of DPP was established in 1972. The current DPP is Stephen Herron who was appointed in 2017. He replaced Barra McGrory QC.

List of Directors of Public Prosecutions for Northern Ireland

 1972 to 1989: Sir Barry Shaw
 1989 to 2010: Sir Alasdair Fraser
 2011 to 2017: Barra McGrory
 2017 to present: Stephen Herron

See also
Director of Public Prosecutions
Director of Public Prosecutions (England and Wales)
Advocate General for Northern Ireland

References

External links
Public Prosecution Service of Northern Ireland official website